PK Lele A Salesman is an Indian adult black comedy film, written and directed by Manav Sohal and produced by Shailesh Gosrani and Manav Sohal under the banner of Mumbai Talkies Company. The film stars Manav Sohal, Brijendra Kala, Sravani Goswami and Vaishnavi Dhanraj in lead roles while Jiten Mukhi and Falguni Rajani will also be seen in the film. The film will be released on 14 December 2018.

Synopsis 
Two good-hearted but eccentric salesmen, PK and Lele, lead a simple life and work for undergarment brand Anmol Macho for their living. However, their lives take an expected turn as PK falls in love with a business tycoon's daughter Mary Marlo and tries to impress her.

Cast 

 Manav Sohal as Mr. PK
 Brijendra Kala as Mr. Lele
 Sravani Goswami as Monika Marlo
 Vaishnavi Dhanraj as Mary Marlo

Soundtrack  

The songs of film are composed by Nayab Ali. The lyrics are written by Saani Aslam and Arvind Singh Sohal.

References

External links
 
 

2018 films
2010s Hindi-language films
Indian comedy films
2018 comedy films
Hindi-language comedy films